Lyaskovets Municipality is a municipality (obshtina) in Veliko Tarnovo Province, Central-North Bulgaria, located in the transition between the Danubian Plain and the area of the so-called Fore-Balkan. It is named after its administrative centre - the town of Lyaskovets.

The main road E772 crosses the area centrally, connecting the province centre of Veliko Tarnovo with the city of Targovishte and the eastern operating part of Hemus motorway.

Settlements 

Lyaskovets Municipality includes the following 6 places (towns are shown in bold):

Demography 
The following table shows the change of the population during the last four decades.

Religion 
According to the latest Bulgarian census of 2011, the religious composition, among those who answered the optional question on religious identification, was the following:

See also
Provinces of Bulgaria
Municipalities of Bulgaria
List of cities and towns in Bulgaria

References

External links
 Official website 

Municipalities in Veliko Tarnovo Province